Notoseris is a genus of Asian flowering plants in the tribe Cichorieae within the family Asteraceae. The plants are native to Asia, primarily China.

 Species

References

Asteraceae genera
Cichorieae